Erik Brian Hanson (born May 18, 1965) is a former Major League Baseball pitcher. During an 11-year baseball career, he pitched for the Seattle Mariners (1988–1993), Cincinnati Reds (1994), Boston Red Sox (1995), and Toronto Blue Jays (1996–1998), and was known for possessing an excellent curveball.

Amateur career
Raised in Kinnelon, New Jersey, Hanson played high school baseball for coach Lew Watts at the Peddie School in Hightstown, New Jersey. He attended Wake Forest University, and in 1984 he played collegiate summer baseball with the Orleans Cardinals of the Cape Cod Baseball League.

Professional career
Hanson won a career high 18 games for the Mariners in 1990 and was a 1995 American League All-Star selection for the Red Sox compiling a 15–5 record that year. Hanson pitched 8 innings in game 2 of the 1995 ALDS Game 2, receiving the loss in a 4–0 decision.

References

External links

Wake Forest Demon Deacons baseball players
American League All-Stars
Seattle Mariners players
Boston Red Sox players
Cincinnati Reds players
Toronto Blue Jays players
American expatriate baseball players in Canada
Calgary Cannons players
Orleans Firebirds players
Baseball players from New Jersey
Major League Baseball pitchers
People from Kinnelon, New Jersey
Peddie School alumni
Sportspeople from Morris County, New Jersey
1965 births
Living people
Chattanooga Lookouts players
Dunedin Blue Jays players
Omaha Golden Spikes players
Vancouver Canadians players